Teracotona postalbida is a moth in the family Erebidae. It was described by Max Gaede in 1926. It is found in Ethiopia.

References

Endemic fauna of Ethiopia
Moths described in 1926
Spilosomina